Kenneth MacDonald (24 April 1898 – unknown) was a Welsh footballer. His regular position was as a striker. He was born in Llanrwst. He played for Inverness Citadel, Clachnacuddin, Aberdeen, Caerau, Cardiff City, Manchester United, Bradford Park Avenue, Hull City, Halifax Town, Coleraine, Walker Celtic and Blyth Spartans.

References

External links
MUFCInfo.com profile

1898 births
Welsh footballers
Association football forwards
Aberdeen F.C. players
Cardiff City F.C. players
Manchester United F.C. players
Bradford (Park Avenue) A.F.C. players
Hull City A.F.C. players
Halifax Town A.F.C. players
Coleraine F.C. players
Blyth Spartans A.F.C. players
Walker Celtic F.C. players
Year of death unknown